Afropisaura is a genus of African nursery web spiders that was first described by P. Blandin in 1976.  it contains only three species, found only in Africa: A. ducis, A. rothiformis, and A. valida.

See also
 List of Pisauridae species

References

Araneomorphae genera
Pisauridae
Spiders of Africa